CCAAT/enhancer-binding protein delta is a protein that in humans is encoded by the CEBPD gene.

Function 

The protein encoded by this intronless gene is a bZIP transcription factor which can bind as a homodimer to certain DNA regulatory regions. It can also form heterodimers with the related protein CEBP-alpha. The encoded protein is important in the regulation of genes involved in immune and inflammatory responses, and may be involved in the regulation of genes associated with activation and/or differentiation of macrophages.

Functions

CEBPD is involved in regulation of apoptosis and cell proliferation. It probably acts as tumor suppressor.

One study in mice showed that CEBPD prevents development of tubular injury and tubulointerstitial fibrogenesis during the progression of chronic obstructive nephropathy.

Function of CEBPD gene can be effectively examined by siRNA knockdown based on an independent validation.

Interactions 

CEBPD has been shown to interact with Mothers against decapentaplegic homolog 3.

See also 
 Ccaat-enhancer-binding proteins

References

Further reading

External links 
 
 

Transcription factors